This list of botanical gardens and arboretums in Louisiana is intended to include all significant botanical gardens and arboretums in the U.S. state of Louisiana

See also
List of botanical gardens and arboretums in the United States

References 

 
Arboreta in Louisiana
botanical gardens and arboretums in Louisiana